(born in 1932) is a researcher and educator in optical communication technology. His research has included the development of Dynamic Single Mode Semiconductor Lasers for actuation and the development of high-capacity, long-distance optical fiber communications technology.

Biography 
Yasuharu Suematsu was born on September 22, 1932, in Gifu, Japan.
He received both his B.S. (1955) and Ph.D. (1960) from the Tokyo Institute of Technology.
Afterward, he joined the faculty of the Tokyo Institute of Technology as a professor and became its president in 1989.
Later he also held the position as first President of the newly founded Kochi University of Technology and later became Director General of the National Institute of Informatics. In 1993, he was elected a member of the National Academy of Engineering for contributions to the understanding and development of optical fibers, high-performance semiconductor lasers, and integrated optoelectronics.

He has authored at least 19 books and more than 260 scientific papers.

Research 
Professor Suematsu is best known for his contributions to the development of optical fiber communication.
He developed semiconductor lasers which even under high-speed modulation produce light at a stable wavelength
that coincides with the wavelength region where the optical losses of fibers reach their minimum.

The Earliest Demonstration of Optical Fiber Communication Experiment
The earliest demonstration of optical fiber communication was performed by Suematsu and his students, on May 26, 1963, on the occasion of the open house of the Tokyo Institute of Technology (Fig.1). 
The light source was a helium-neon gas laser, the modulator was hand made modulator by use of ADP crystal, applied signal voice voltage of 1.200 volts, for polarization rotation in response to the voice signal, the optical bundle glass fiber for the transmission medium, and the photomultiplier tube for the detector. The original ADP reserved in the desiccator as well as the replica of that experiment, restored in 2008-7 as shown in Fig.1, was registered as a Future Technology Heritage, at the National Museum of Science, Japan, in 2019.

Creation of Dynamic Single Mode Lasers
Light is the highest frequency of electromagnetic waves that humans can control. It outperforms radio waves by a wide margin in transmitting a large capacity of information. Research into optical communications was undertaken such as in the U.S.A., Japan, and England. The nature of optical fiber communication was thought possibly be able to transmit a large capacity of information over a long distance, all over the world. To make it a reality, the focus was on creating a Dynamic Single Mode laser (DSM laser) (Fig.2) which has the following three characteristics:

(1) operates at a wavelength band that causes minimal loss within the optical fiber to allow for long-distance transmission (1.5 micrometers was discovered to be the ideal wavelength band during the course of the following research);

(2) operates stably at a single wavelength to surmount the problem of transmission capacity reduction due to dispersion on the propagation constant in single-mode optical fiber; and

(3) allows the wavelength to be tuned to adapt to communication in multiple wavelengths.

First, in 1972–1974, Suematsu and his student proposed a single mode resonator that would consist of a refractive index waveguide for the transverse mode, and two distributed reflectors joined together with a phase shift by odd numbers of a half π for the axial single mode operation (Fig.2) . In the meantime, Suematsu pioneered materials for a mixed crystal of GaInAsP/InP for a semiconductor laser that would operate at a wavelength band of 1.5 micrometers—which causes minimal loss inside the optical fiber as Donald A. Keck et al. suggested in 1973— and continuously operates at room temperature, in July 1979. 
Following these preliminary achievements, Suematsu and his co-workers succeeded in creating an integrated laser with built-in distributed reflectors using a material in the band of 1.5 micrometers. In October 1980, Suematsu and his students built a dynamic single-mode laser that stably operates at a single mode even under rapid direct modulation (Fig.3 and Fig.4), and continuously operates at room temperature. This laser remained in stable operation mode even when the temperature was changed so that the wavelength could be tuned thermally within the 1.5 micrometers band. Thus, the thermo-tunable dynamic single-mode laser was born and triggered to develop a 1.5-micrometer high-speed fiber system, as cited by such as the 1983 Valdemar Poulsen Gold Medal, the Danish history of optical communication, and the 1986 David Sarnoff Award. Its spectral behavior was investigated profoundly to attain full single-mode operation. Meanwhile, research and development progressed in industries in areas such as optical fibers, optical circuits, optical devices, modulation schemes, and system structures. The actualization of the dynamic single-mode laser became an impetus to develop high-capacity and long-distance optical fiber communications, and it began to be applied commercially at the end of the 1980s.

Phase-Shift Distributed Feedback Laser
Among these, the phase-shift distributed feedback (DFB) laser that Suematsu and his students proposed in 1974 and demonstrated with Kazuhito Furuya in November 1983 (Fig.5) is a thermo-tunable dynamic single-mode laser which had a high rate of production yield, as cited by the 1985 Electronics Letter Premium Award, IEE, UK. Since the beginning of the 1990s, it had been consistently and widely used commercially as a standard laser for long-distance use, as awarded the 1994 C&C Prize. Often, a laser array is used to cover wide wavelength regions (Fig.6).

Wavelength Tunable Laser 
On the other hand, the electro-tunable dynamic single-mode laser, which would be a goal of the Dynamic Single Mode Laser, is, a so-called, wavelength tunable laser that was proposed by Suematsu and his students in 1980 (Fig.7) and demonstrated in 1983. Later, the tuning wavelength range was increased by the introduction of distributed reflectors with multi-grating pitches by Yuichi Tohmori and Yuhzou Yoshikuni, and Larry Coldren. The electro-tunable dynamic single-mode laser is especially important because it could be finely tunable and also monolithically integrable together with other photonic devices which need the specific thermal tuning separately in the form of PICs (Photonic Integrated Circuits). It was around 2004, through the efforts of those involved, that this wavelength tunable laser was developed and used commercially in dense wavelength division multiplexing (D-WDM) systems and optical coherent systems. It became utilized in earnest around 2010.

Social Contribution by Research
High-capacity and long-distance optical fiber communications in the lowest loss wavelength band of 1.5 micrometers use dynamic single mode lasers (DSM lasers), such as phase shift distributed feedback lasers and wavelength tunable lasers, as their light sources,  and have progressed along with research and development of optical fiber, optical devices, modulation schemes, and the like. Phase shift distributed feedback lasers developed by this research have been commercially applied for long distances—for overland trunk systems (1987) and for intercontinental submarine cables (1992) (Fig. 8) —and continue to support the progress of the Internet to this day.
Later, since around 2004, wavelength tunable lasers are being used as the light source to advance dense wavelength division multiplexing (D-WDM) systems and optical coherent fiber systems for multi-level modulation schemes. 
Optical fiber communications make up a highly dense communications network circling the globe tens of thousands of times and are also used in applications such as middle-distance Ethernets. Additionally, DSM lasers in the band of 1.5 micrometers are used for optical lines from the exchange center to the home in FTTH. The transmission performance of fiber represented a by-product of the transmission capacity and the distance has been increased yearly exponentially, as shown in Fig. 9. 
In such ways, the information transmission capability of optical fiber has reached several hundred thousand times as much as the coaxial cables preceding them and has significantly lowered the cost of transmitting the information. Reflecting this, the mid-1990s saw the network industry such as Yahoo, Google, and Rakuten appear one after the other. Optical fiber communications have progressed and the Internet has developed, and instantaneous transmission of a large volume of knowledge is now a daily occurrence. In 2018, the Internet population reached 39 billion, 52% of the world population.
In the electrical communication era of the 1960s, large volumes of data, such as documents on which civilization depend, were circulated slowly in forms such as books. In contrast, the proliferation of high-capacity and long-distance optical fiber communications has allowed for large-volume information such as books to become used interactively in an instant. The research of optical fiber communications contributed to the rapid transition to a civilization based on the information and communications technology.

References 

Japanese physicists
1932 births
Living people
People from Gifu Prefecture
Academic staff of Tokyo Institute of Technology
Tokyo Institute of Technology alumni
Recipients of the Medal with Purple Ribbon
Recipients of the Order of Culture